Kepez is a seaside town (belde) in the Çanakkale District, Çanakkale Province, Turkey. Its population is 35,390 (2022). The town has its own municipality which was established in 1992.

Geography
Kepez is located 3 kilometers south from Çanakkale city center. It is on the main İzmir to Çanakkale highway, the D.550. Kepez has a port.

Population 

Kepez is a rapidly growing town, made up of predominantly new housing in the form of apartment blocks.

Facilities

There is a water park in Kepez and it has its own beach area and a sea front promenade with restaurants, cafes and a picnic area. The town has a municipality building, a large park and picnic area and playground for children as well as a small park in the centre which has a couple of small tea houses. There are some supermarkets and small shops and many small restaurants. The area is served with a central taxi point and is on the Çanakkale bus route with regular connections to the city centre. Kepez has a covered market which is open every Monday. 

Kepez has a large dental centre, social services centre and two hospitals nearby. The Turhan Mildon Culture and Craft Centre organizes regular events. There is a sports stadium and a chess club.

References

Towns in Turkey
Populated places in Çanakkale Province
Çanakkale District